Ludovic Liron (born January 30, 1978 in Béziers) is a French football defender who played for clubs in French Ligue 1 and Ligue 2.

Career
Liron helped three clubs win promotion to Ligue 1, and was a key member of the Valenciennes FC that won 2005–06 Ligue 2.

References

External links 

1978 births
Living people
Sportspeople from Béziers
French footballers
Stade de Reims players
ES Troyes AC players
Valenciennes FC players
French beach soccer players
Association football defenders
Footballers from Occitania (administrative region)